Fates Forever was a video game marketed by its developer as the first MOBA (Multiplayer Online Battle Arena) designed exclusively for tablets.

Fates Forever is a Massively Multiplayer game Online Battle Arena (MOBA) reinterpreted from the ground up for the iPad. The game is developed by Hammer & Chisel Inc. The game features 3-vs-3 gameplay, inspired by successful MOBA games like League of Legends (LoL) and Defense of the Ancients (DoTA).

Gameplay
There were ten playable characters in Fates Forever at launch, with at least four more planned for post-release. Each character had several special abilities that were unique to the play-style of each player-character.
As of early 2015, there were 14 characters. Fates Forever is no longer available for download or for gameplay. The app and supporting community webpage were disabled in October 2015.

Release
Fates Forever was officially released on iPad worldwide on July 3, 2014, as the first game developed and published by start-up game studio Hammer & Chisel a company founded by former OpenFeint CEO Jason Citron, with the intent to build "great, complex games that don't compromise simply because they're for mobile device".

The game's development staff would later go on to develop Discord, an online VoIP platform designed as a hub for people to chat in, which went on to be one of the most successful chatting platforms in the world.

Reception

The game had a Metacritic score of 82/100 based on 8 critic reviews.

References

2014 video games
IOS games
IOS-only games
Multiplayer online battle arena games
Inactive massively multiplayer online games
Video games developed in the United States